Lăcătuș or Lăcătușu is an occupational Romanian surname that means locksmith. It may refer to
Izabela Lăcătuș (born 1976), Romanian artistic and aerobic gymnast 
Marius Lăcătuș (born 1964), Romanian football player 
Mihaela Lăcătuș (born 1981), Romanian boxer
Constantin Lăcătușu (born 1961), Romanian mountain climber 

Romanian-language surnames
Occupational surnames